NFL GameDay (stylized as NFL GameDay Morning presented by Lowe's (Sunday regular season mornings only) or NFL GameDay Morning presented by Intuit TurboTax (playoff and Super Bowl editions only), NFL GameDay Live presented by GEICO (at the start of 1 PM and 4 PM (ET) doubleheader games),  NFL GameDay Highlights presented by CDW (after 1 PM and 4 PM (ET) doubleheader games) and NFL GameDay Prime presented by Mercedes-Benz (after Sunday night games) for sponsorship reasons) is an American television program that features highlights of the National Football League games for the day. It airs on the NFL Network, having debuted on September 10, 2006. The program starts at either 11:00 p.m. Eastern time or the moment that NBC Sunday Night Football concludes, whichever is later. When NBC does not carry a game, it begins at 8 p.m. ET, or after NFL RedZone goes off the air, which happened twice in 2006, on October 22 and December 24, and also on December 31, 2017.

Summary 
Rich Eisen was the initial anchor, and former NFL defensive back Deion Sanders and head coach Steve Mariucci were the analysts when NFL GameDay debuted in September 2006.

NFL Network claims that this is the only long-form highlight show about the league in the late-night slot on Sunday, although Chris Berman and Tom Jackson host extended packages called "The Blitz" as part of SportsCenter.

On October 1, 2006, Week 4 of the season, Eisen missed the program.  No reason was given for his absence, but Fran Charles filled in as host of the show, just as he sometimes does on NFL Total Access.  The following week, October 8, Eisen returned.

Starting in November 2007, NFL GameDay would be shown in Ireland on the over-the-air broadcast network TV3, in a late-night slot on Thursdays.

Effective fall 2010, Rich Eisen is no longer hosting NFL GameDay Final as he is now hosting NFL GameDay Morning. Fran Charles is now the new host, joined by Steve Mariucci, Deion Sanders and Michael Irvin as analysts.

Effective fall 2012, Chris Rose replaces Fran Charles as host on NFL GameDay Final. He is joined by analysts Deion Sanders, Michael Irvin and Marshall Faulk.

Starting in 2018, the show, now known as NFL GameDay Prime is also syndicated to several Fox affiliates as part of the network’s Thursday Night Football contract.
In 2020 season Deion Sanders became the Head Coach at Jackson State University thus leaving the show and the shows name went back to NFL GameDay Final with Chris Rose hosting and Steve Smith as an analyst.

References

2006 American television series debuts
2010s American television series
GameDay